Khalia Collier is the owner of the St. Louis Surge, and commissioner of its league the Global Women's Basketball Association (GWBA). Collier formerly served as the associate director at the Saint Louis University Chaifetz School of Business. In October 2020, she became Vice President of Community Relations for the Saint Louis Soccer Club

Life and career
Collier was born and raised in St. Louis. Collier played for Fort Zumwalt South High School and college basketball at Columbia College and Missouri Baptist University. Graduating with a degree in communications, Collier went on to work for a Fortune 500 company, but quickly returned to basketball, purchasing the Surge in 2011. As a member of the Women's Blue Chip Basketball League, the Surge won two championships under Collier's direction. As of 2019, the Surge have moved to the GWBA, where Collier also serves as the league's commissioner. The Surge play home games at the Washington University in St. Louis Field House.

References 

American sports businesspeople
Living people
American women in business
Businesspeople from St. Louis
Year of birth missing (living people)
21st-century American women